Naveed Ahmed (born 3 January 1993) is a Pakistani international footballer, who plays for Pakistan Navy as a centre-back, he can also play as a midfielder. He played his first international match on 19 November 2012 against Singapore in an international friendly, which Singapore won 4–0.

Career statistics

Club

International

References

External links

Pakistani footballers
Pakistan international footballers
Living people
1993 births
Footballers at the 2014 Asian Games
Association football midfielders
Asian Games competitors for Pakistan
Pakistan Navy F.C. players